Amin Liew Abdullah is the Minister of Finance and Economy, and the chairman of the Brunei Economic Development Board (BEDB) and Bank Islam Brunei Darussalam (BIBD).

Education 
Amin earned a Bachelor's degree from Queen Mary College, University of London in 1984, as well as a Master's degree and a PhD from Imperial College, University of London, in 1989 and 1993, respectively. He has been a Chartered Financial Analyst (CFA) since 2004. He belongs to CFA Singapore as well.

Political career
Prior to joining the Brunei government, Amin spent the middle of the 1990s working as a crude oil trader for Brunei Shell Petroleum after returning from the United Kingdom, where he had previously spent the late 1980s and early 1990s as a research analyst for ICI Finance. Amin sits on the boards of numerous Brunei Government-affiliated businesses in a variety of industries, such as telecommunications, healthcare, hospitality, oil and gas, information technology, and education.

Amin held the position of CEO of Darussalam Assets (DA), an investment holding company owned by the Minister For Finance Corporation, Brunei Darussalam. He was also the Deputy minister of Finance (Investment). Before joining DA, Amin served in a number of capacities for the Bruneian government, including as managing director of the Brunei Investment Agency (BIA), permanent secretary of the Ministry of Finance, and permanent secretary of the Ministry of Industry and Primary Resources.

Previously serving as the Minister of Finance II from 30 January 2018, he was appointed on 27 September 2018, to the position of Minister in the Prime Minister's Office and was reappointed on 7 June 2022. Amin welcomed Thailand's priority under the APEC Finance Ministers Process, FMP, during a recent dialogue between finance ministers and the APEC Business Advisory Council in Bangkok, Thailand.

At its new Corporate Lounge, which is housed at the TBA Head Office in Beribi, Takaful Brunei formally introduced the Takaful Brunei Corporate, which is only available to company owners and corporate entities. In his position as Chairman of Takaful Brunei and its subsidiaries, Takaful Brunei Am (TBA) and Takaful Brunei Keluarga (TBK), Amin Liew officiated the ceremony.

Honours 

  Order of Setia Negara Brunei First Class (PSNB) – Dato Seri Setia
  Order of Seri Paduka Mahkota Brunei (SPMB) – Dato Seri Paduka

References

Living people
Government ministers of Brunei
Year of birth missing (living people)
Alumni of Queen Mary University of London
Alumni of Imperial College London
Finance ministers of Brunei
Bruneian people of Chinese descent